Burniston is a village and civil parish in the Scarborough borough of North Yorkshire, England. It is situated about four miles north of Scarborough itself, on the A171 road. According to the 2011 UK census Burniston parish had a population of 1,523, an increase on the 2001 UK census figure of 1,389. With all the new houses at River Meadows, the population is now roughly 1,500. The parish council is Burniston Parish Council.

History
The area is known for its prehistoric legacy. Dinosaur footprints have been found in the rocks at Burniston.

The village appears, named Brennigston, in the Doomsday Book of 1086; the name means "farmstead of a man named Brýningr" in Old Norse.  The first church was built in 1235, and the first record of a pub was in 1782 when there were three alehouse keepers.

A permanent military presence was established in the village with the completion of Burniston Barracks in 1861.

Burniston has held an annual agricultural show since 1888.

In the mid-1990s, the 17th century blacksmith's forge, one of the oldest buildings in the village, was demolished for safety reasons. In 1995, the parish council celebrated its centenary by distributing mugs decorated with the village crest in gold and blue to village schoolchildren.

Amenities
The village has a post office on the High Street, and two pubs, the Three Jolly Sailors and the Oak Wheel. It also has a petrol station which has a garage attached (Burniston Motor Works) and car sales, as well as England's garage, a former petrol station. Burniston Village Hall and its land include a park and tennis courts. It has one guest house, Harmony Country Lodge, which has an octagonal design. There are two churches, the Methodist chapel in the High Street and Harmony Church and Healing Sanctuary at the top of Limestone Road, which is non-religious Christian. The Methodist chapel has recently undergone redevelopment to accommodate an increasing membership. The expansion included a more modern design which complements the retained old building.

The village school (Lindhead) attracts families from outside the area and is the centre of much community activity. The village hall in Burniston is shared with the adjoining area of Cloughton, and the two areas are linked in many ways. The annual pantomime is usually a sell-out, and the hall is used by many community groups. Generations of villagers help organise an important range of community activities.

More recently, the village has become a commuter area — being surrounded by greenery but near enough to town.

References

External links

Burniston Parish Council website
Burniston Methodist Church website

Villages in North Yorkshire
Civil parishes in North Yorkshire